Anthony M. Massad (June 15, 1928 - April 9, 2017) was an American lawyer and politician.

Born in Shidler, Oklahoma, Massad served in the United States Army Reserve. Massad went to the Oklahoma Military Academy. He received his bachelor's degree from University of Oklahoma in 1949 and his law degree from University of Oklahoma College of Law in 1955. He practiced law in Frederick, Oklahoma and served on the Frederick City Council. Massad was assistant county attorney for Tillman County, Oklahoma. From 1965 to 1969, Massad served in the Oklahoma State Senate as a Democrat.

Notes

1928 births
2017 deaths
People from Shidler, Oklahoma
People from Frederick, Oklahoma
University of Oklahoma alumni
University of Oklahoma College of Law alumni
Military personnel from Oklahoma
Oklahoma lawyers
Oklahoma city council members
Democratic Party Oklahoma state senators
20th-century American lawyers